"Radar Love" is a song by the Dutch rock band Golden Earring. The single version of "Radar Love" reached #9 in the Record World  Singles Chart, #10 on the Cash Box Top 100 and #13 in Billboard in the United States. It also hit the Top 10 in many countries, including the United Kingdom, Canada, Australia, Germany, and Spain.

Lyrics

The song is written from the point of view of a truck driver who says he has some sort of psychic connection with his girlfriend — "radar love". He senses that she urgently wants him to be with her, and it makes him reckless. His recklessness causes him to have a fatal accident, but even in the afterlife the song's narrator and his lover still have radar love.

Composition
Like other famous songs of the era ("Highway Star", "Stairway to Heaven", "Bohemian Rhapsody"), "Radar Love" is composed as a suite with several distinctive and quite different sections (although the tonality remains similar throughout).

The intro starts with a guitar riff in four movements. The first movement is up from C# minor with three power chords slightly reminiscent of Deep Purple's "Smoke on the Water". The second movement heads down, the third is up again, higher than the previous, and the fourth leads all down to E major. According to bass player Rinus Gerritsen the intro was inspired by Carlos Santana.

During the chorus, starting in C# minor at 1:20, the band is joined by a brass section and the drum beat is doubled to give the impression that the tempo has speeded up.

The song references Brenda Lee's "Coming On Strong" from 1967 as a "forgotten song".

Impact 
According to Rustyn Rose at Metalholic, the song "is a rock masterpiece, from its hooky chugging bassline, to its simple but unmistakable riffs, to its catchy anthemesque chorus. Even the jam which rides the song out is note for note classic".

The song has been chosen by many magazines and websites as a Top 10 driving song. Often it ranked in the top three. In polls it was chosen as the best radio song by readers of the newspaper Washington Post in November 2001. It resulted the #1 driving song in Australia (Australian Musician Magazine, November 2005), beating two AC/DC-songs, and in Canada (BBC Canada, March 2006). In 2011 it received a vast number of votes as the "Ultimate Driving Song" in a poll at PlanetRock and "finished well ahead of its nearest rival, Deep Purple's Highway Star".

The bassline, guitar improv and drum solo riff was used in the late 1970s and early 1980s as part of the opening credits and theme to the long running Australian current affairs programme Four Corners produced by ABC before it segues into the official theme, Robert Maxwell's "Lost Patrol".

Cover versions
According to https://radar-love.net/, the song has been covered more than 500 times, among others by Tribe 8, Ministry, Omen, U2, R.E.M., Ian Stuart Donaldson, Sun City Girls, Dutch group Centerfold, White Lion, Blue Man Group, Def Leppard,  James Last, NWOBHM band Aragorn, Nine Pound Hammer, Oh Well, Joe Santana, the Space Lady and the Pressure Boys. White Lion's version charted at #59 on the Billboard Hot 100.

Goth-pop band Ghost Dance recorded a cover of the song on the B-side of their "Heart Full of Soul" single, itself a cover of the Yardbirds track.

A pre-Mercyful Fate band featuring King Diamond on vocals recorded a cover of the song. It is featured on King Diamond & Black Rose 20 Years Ago.

WaveGroup Sound covered the White Lion version of the song on Guitar Hero Encore: Rocks the 80s.

In popular culture
The song was featured in the Wayne's World 2 and appears on the film's soundtrack. The song was featured heavily in the Reaper episode "Love, Bullets and Blacktop", the name of a fictional movie. The song is featured in The Simpsons episodes "Bart on the Road" and "Poppa's Got a Brand New Badge", the 2017 movie Baby Driver, and at the beginning of George Clooney's 2021 film The Tender Bar. It is sung in the closing credits of the Bob's Burgers episode "Bobby Driver" by Bob and Edith. It also appears in the Sega Genesis version of Rock n' Roll Racing by Silicon & Synapse (now known as Blizzard Entertainment).

Chart history

Weekly charts

Radar Love {1977}

White Lion 

Oh Well

Year-end charts

Certifications

References

External links
Official "Radar Love" website

1973 singles
1974 singles
Songs about cars
Songs about radio
Songs written by Barry Hay
Songs written by George Kooymans
Golden Earring songs
1989 singles
1973 songs
Polydor Records singles
Track Records singles
MCA Records singles
Atlantic Records singles